The number of MPs and senators are prescribed in the French constitution of 4 October 1958.

History

References

See also 

 Number of Westminster MPs

Legal history of France
National Assembly (France)
Parliamentary history of France
Government of France
Numbering in politics